Purekkari Cape is a cape in Pärispea village, Harju County. It is the northernmost part of Pärispea peninsula and is also the northernmost land point of Estonia.

There are erratic boulders, like Purekkari Maasäärekivi (:et).

References

External links

Geography of Estonia
Kuusalu Parish